Royal Air Force Ballyhalbert or more simply RAF Ballyhalbert is a former Royal Air Force station at Ballyhalbert on the Ards Peninsula, County Down, Northern Ireland

RAF Kirkistown was a satellite to the larger Ballyhalbert.

Construction began in 1940.

History

Royal Air Force use
It opened provisionally in May 1941, prior to completion of the works, as a RAF Fighter Command base where the primary weapon was the Supermarine Spitfire, and officially on 28 June of that same year. The base provided local protection from Luftwaffe raids on Belfast and the rest of the province. Other aircraft operated from the base were the Hawker Hurricane, Bristol Beaufighter, North American Mustang and Boulton Paul Defiant night fighter. During its lifetime, Ballyhalbert was home to RAF, Women's Auxiliary Air Force (WAAF), British Army, Royal Navy and United States Army Air Forces (USAAF) personnel. Servicemen from Australia, New Zealand, Canada and Poland also saw duty at Ballyhalbert.

 Squadrons

 Units

Fleet Air Arm use
As HMS Corncrake the airfield was used by the Fleet Air Arm for squadrons working up for carrier duty. On 13 November 1945 the airfield was closed and placed on Care and Maintenance. By 1947, with no further use made of the site it was abandoned. The airfield was sold to developers in March 1960, and is in use for several popular caravan parks.

 Fleet Air Arm units

See also
List of former Royal Air Force stations

References

Citations

Bibliography

External links
Photographs of Ballyhalbert Airfield

Ballyhalbert
World War II sites in Northern Ireland
Royal Air Force stations of World War II in the United Kingdom
Buildings and structures in County Down
Military history of County Down
Defunct airports in Northern Ireland